The Arthur W. Hoofman House is a historic house at North Cross and East Race Streets in Searcy, Arkansas.  It is a -story brick structure, with a side-facing gable roof that has a half-timbered gable end.  The massing of the house is complex, with a variety of dormer and gable shapes, and a wraparound porch recessed under the roof, supported by an arcade of brick piers.  The house, built in 1931 for a strawberry grower, is the city's finest example of high style English Revival architecture.

The house was listed on the National Register of Historic Places in 1992.

See also
National Register of Historic Places listings in White County, Arkansas

References

Houses on the National Register of Historic Places in Arkansas
Houses completed in 1931
Houses in Searcy, Arkansas
National Register of Historic Places in Searcy, Arkansas
Tudor Revival architecture in Arkansas
1931 establishments in Arkansas